Streptomyces goshikiensis is a bacterium species from the genus of Streptomyces which has been isolated from soil in Japan. Streptomyces goshikiensis produces bandamycin A and bandamycin B.

See also 
 List of Streptomyces species

References

Further reading

External links
Type strain of Streptomyces goshikiensis at BacDive -  the Bacterial Diversity Metadatabase

goshikiensis
Bacteria described in 1966